No. 218 Squadron RAF was a squadron of the Royal Air Force. It was also known as No 218 (Gold Coast) Squadron after the Governor of the Gold Coast (modern Ghana) and people of the Gold Coast officially adopted the squadron.

History

World War I
The squadron was first formed at Dover on 24 April 1918, going into action a month later in France. The unit flew Airco DH.9s in daylight bombing raids and during its 5 months of wartime service, it dropped  of bombs over enemy targets in France and Belgium, flying a total of 117 sorties. In 1919, the unit was disbanded, having claimed 37 enemy aircraft during the war.

World War II

The squadron was reformed on 16 March 1936 from elements of 57 Squadron at RAF Upper Heyford with the Hawker Hind and re-equipped with the Fairey Battle in 1938. On 2 September 1939, the unit moved back to France, where it began dropping leaflets and flying reconnaissance missions. By June 1940, having suffered many losses while bombing advancing German troops, the unit was evacuated to England, where it converted to the Bristol Blenheim. In November, it rearmed with Vickers Wellingtons and began bombing a wide variety of Axis targets with the new longer-range aeroplanes. In December 1941, the squadron began changing to Short Stirlings and continued its bombing raids in occupied Europe against everything from infantry columns to V-weapon sites. Missions in 1942 included Operation Canonbury 1 and 2 on the night of 24 April and 4 May to bomb the Skoda factory at Pilsen in Czechoslovakia, in support of the partisan group inserted to assassinate Reinhard Heydrich in Operation Anthropoid. In July 1942, the unit moved to RAF Downham Market and in March 1944 to RAF Woolfox Lodge in Rutland. In August 1944, it moved once more, this time to RAF Methwold with the Avro Lancaster.

Just before the D-Day invasions in Normandy, the Stirlings of 218 Squadron undertook diversionary bombing raids against Wehrmacht shore defences near Pas de Calais. 218 squadron played a significant role in a diversion known as Operation Glimmer in which Window was dropped to simulate a naval fleet headed towards the French coast.

It is to the credit of the pilots and navigators of 218 Squadron that the German shore batteries actually opened fire on the "ghost" fleet that they created. The German 2nd Panzer Division and 116th Panzer Division remained at the Pas de Calais for at least two weeks after D-Day, because they believed that Pas de Calais would be the site of a major British operation. In December 1944 it moved to Chedburgh as a transport unit. It ceased wartime operations in May 1945, just before the German surrender. Afterwards, it began performing a number of relief efforts in Europe, ranging from rescuing POWs to transporting food and other supplies. No. 218 Squadron's awards include a Victoria Cross awarded posthumously to Flight Sergeant Arthur Louis Aaron for "most conspicuous bravery" during a raid on Turin on 12/13 August 1943. Despite his aircraft being badly damaged and suffering injuries, he brought his aircraft in to land at Bone, Algeria (now Annaba Airfield) where he later died of his wounds.

Post War
The unit was linked to No. 115 Squadron RAF between February 1949 and March 1950 and also for the period June 1950 to June 1957. The squadron was reformed – as 218(SM) Sqn. – on 1 December 1959 as one of 20 Strategic Missile (SM) squadrons associated with Project Emily. The squadron was equipped with three Thor Intermediate range ballistic missiles, and based at RAF Harrington in Northamptonshire. In October 1962, during the Cuban Missile Crisis, the squadron was kept at full readiness, with the missiles aimed at strategic targets in the USSR. The squadron was disbanded on 23 August 1963, with the termination of the Thor Program in Britain.

Notable pilots
 Karl S. Day
 Phil Lamason
 Arthur Louis Aaron
 Hank Wardle

References

External links

 RAF History – Bomber Command 60th Anniversary
 RAF.mod.uk History

218
Military units and formations established in 1918
1918 establishments in England